Elderfields Preserve (also known as Elderfields Historic Preserve) is a historic museum, farm, nature preserve, and cultural center located within the Incorporated Village of Flower Hill, in Nassau County, on Long Island, in New York, United States. it is owned and operated by the County of Nassau.

Description

Overview 
The preserve is home to the Hewlett-Munson-Williams House. This farmhouse was built around 1675 as part of the historic Hewlett farm, making it one of the oldest homes still standing in the area and on Long Island, as a whole. The Hewlett family owned this property for 224 years, until selling it to Carlos W. Munson - the heir to the Munson Steamship Company - in 1904. Carlos and his wife, Mabel, were prominent figures in the early history of Flower Hill, and Carlos was the person who named the farm Elderfields. 

Henry de V. Williams would eventually purchase the property, and left the land to Nassau County, which acquired it in 1996. 

A walled garden and two carriage sheds are also located in the preserve.

The Art Guild 
Elderfields Preserve is also home to The Art Guild of Port Washington. The Art Guild offers art classes, summer programs, and studio space. They also put on art shows and exhibitions for the public.

See also 

 Flower Hill, New York
 The Sands-Willets Homestead - Another historic home within the Village of Flower Hill.

References

External links 
 Elderfields Preserve Official Website (Nassau County, NY)
 The Art Guild of Port Washington Official Website

Flower Hill, New York
Museums in Nassau County, New York
Parks in Nassau County, New York
Nassau County, New York